The 1976 World Championship Tennis circuit was one of the two rival professional men's tennis circuits of 1976. It was organized by World Championship Tennis (WCT) and consisted of a schedule of 25 tournaments leading up to a singles WCT Finals play-off in Dallas and a doubles play-off in Kansas City in May. A total of 54 players participated, 30 players less than in the previous three years, and the group system used in the previous editions was replaced by a single pool. The U.S. Pro Indoor was the only tournament in which all players participated, all other tournaments had a 16 men draw. The season final was played by the eight best performers and was won by the Swede Björn Borg who defeated Guillermo Vilas from Argentina in four sets. The total prize money for the 1976 WCT circuit was $2,400,000, including a $320,000 Avis Challenge Cup round–robin special event played in Hawaii in January and May.

The Aetna World Cup between teams of the US and Australia was played in March in Hartford and was won by the US 6–1.

Overview

Schedule
The schedule of events on the 1976 WCT circuit, with player progression documented until the quarterfinals stage.

January

February

March

April

May

Standings

* Qualified for the WCT Finals.

See also
 1976 Grand Prix circuit

Notes

References

External links
 ATP 1976 results archive

 
World Championship Tennis circuit seasons
World Championship Tennis